The Anglo-Chinese Schools of Malaysia refer to a number of Methodist-founded schools. The schools in Malaysia are not affiliated with the Anglo-Chinese Schools of Singapore, although also founded by the same denomination.

Malacca
 Anglo-Chinese School (ACS) or SMK Methodist, Malacca
 The first Anglo-Chinese School (Malacca)

Penang
Methodist Boys' School, Penang (formerly Anglo Chinese School Penang or ACSP).

Negeri Sembilan
 SMK Methodist (ACS), Seremban (1915)
SK Methodist (ACS), Seremban (1915)

Perak
 SM Methodist (ACS), Ipoh (1895)
 SMK Horley Methodist (ACS), Teluk Intan (1899)
 SM Methodist (ACS), Kampar
 SMK Methodist (ACS), Sitiawan (1903)
 SMK Methodist (ACS), Parit Buntar (1907)

Selangor
 SK Methodist (ACS), Klang (1893)
 SM Methodist (ACS), Klang (1893)

External links
  SM Methodist (ACS), Klang
 SM Methodist (ACS), Kampar
 SM Methodist (ACS), Malacca
 SM Methodist (ACS), Seremban (Archived 2009-10-25)
 SM Methodist (ACS), Sitiawan 

Methodist schools